The given name Oddbjørn or Odd-Bjørn may refer to:

Oddbjørn Engvold (born 1938), Norwegian astronomer
Odd-Bjørn Fure (born 1942), Norwegian historian and political scientist
Oddbjørn Hågård (1940–2013), Norwegian politician for the Centre Party
Oddbjørn Hagen (1908–1983), Norwegian skier who competed in Nordic combined and cross-country skiing
Odd-Bjørn Hjelmeset (born 1971), Norwegian cross-country skier who has competed since 1993
Oddbjørn Nordset (born 1946), Norwegian civil servant and politician for the Centre Party
Oddbjørn Snøfugl (born 1941), Norwegian politician for the Centre Party
Oddbjørn Sverre Langlo (1935–2004), Norwegian politician for the Conservative Party
Oddbjørn Vatne (born 1948), Norwegian politician for the Centre Party